Mohammad Sohrabi is an Iranian retired gendarme who held office as the last chief of the Iranian Gendarmerie from 1985 to 1991. He also served as the first chief of the unified Law Enforcement Force from 1991 to 1992.

Early life and education 
Sohrabi was born in 1940, in Tabas. He was graduated from the military academy of Imperial Iranian Army.

Career 
Following the Iranian Revolution, Sohrabi was appointed as the chief of gendarmerie forces of Gilan Province in February 1979. On 9 February 1985, he became the national chief of gendarmerie. He was promoted to the rank of brigadier general in 1987. Sohrabi continued to serve in the capacity until 1 April 1991, when the forces were formally merged into the Law Enforcement Force, the unified police force in the country. He was responsible for supervising the merger process involving Shahrbani and Revolutionary Committees in addition to his own service, and was subsequently appointed as the chief of the newly-formed police forces. Sohrabi was replaced on 24 September 1992 and became retired.

References 

1940 births
Living people
People from South Khorasan Province
Iranian Gendarmerie personnel
Chief commanders of Law Enforcement Force of Islamic Republic of Iran